The following lists events that happened during 2002 in Sri Lanka.

Incumbents
President: Chandrika Kumaratunga.
Prime Minister: Ranil Wickremesinghe.
Chief Justice: Sarath N. Silva.

Governors
 Central Province – K. B. Ratnayake (until 27 June); Monty Gopallawa (starting 27 June)
 North Central Province – G. M. S. Samaraweera 
 North Eastern Province – Asoka Jayawardena  
 North Western Province – Siripala Jayaweera 
 Sabaragamuwa Province – C. N. Saliya Mathew 
 Southern Province – Ananda Dassanayake (until January); Kingsley Wickramaratne (starting 1 February)
 Uva Province – Sirisena Amarasiri 
 Western Province – Pathmanathan Ramanathan (until 1 February); Alavi Moulana (starting 1 February)

Chief Ministers
 Central Province – Sarath Ekanayake (until 30 April); W. M. P. B. Dissanayake (starting 30 April) 
 North Central Province – Berty Premalal Dissanayake
 North Western Province – S. B. Nawinne (until 2002); Athula Wijesinghe (starting 2002)
 Sabaragamuwa Province – Mohan Ellawala 
 Southern Province – H. G. Sirisena 
 Uva Province – Aththintha Marakalage Buddhadasa 
 Western Province – Reginald Cooray

Events
Sri Lanka participated in the 2002 Asian Games held in South Korea, from September 29 to October 14, 2002. The Sri Lankan athletes won 2 gold medals (grand total of 6), and achieved 21st spot in the event.
Hikkaduwa National Park is established on 19 September 2002, this was done to protect the aquatic ecosystem. Formerly a wildlife sanctuary, it now serves as a national tourist attraction full of diverse wildlife.

Notes

a.  Gunaratna, Rohan. (1998). Pg.353, Sri Lanka's Ethnic Crisis and National Security, Colombo: South Asian Network on Conflict Research.

References

 
Years of the 21st century in Sri Lanka
Sri Lanka